Moszna  is a small village in south-west Poland, approximately  from Opole, known for its notable fairy-tale castle.

The village
In 1309 the area, which is nowadays occupied by Moszna, was settled by a family called Mosce or Moschin. In 1679 the village belonged to the family of von Skalls and it became the property of Wilhelm von Reisewitz around 1723. Later on, Moszna belonged to Heinrich Leopold von Seherr-Toss (since 1771); Heinrich von Erdmansdorf (1853); and to Hubert von Tiele-Winckler (since 1866).

A horse breeding farm was founded in Moszna in 1946. It was based on a herd from a liquidated farm in Dłonie, near Rawicz. The farm in Moszna has kept thoroughbred horses from the very beginning and it expanded its husbandry with cross-breeds in 1961.

The castle

The castle in Moszna is one of the best known monuments in the western part of Upper Silesia.

Gallery

References

External links
Official website
Photo gallery
Sferical panorama photo gallery

Villages in Krapkowice County
Historic house museums in Poland
Museums in Opole Voivodeship